General Benjamin Richard Pieter Frans Hasselman (14 March 1898 – 2 March 1984) was an officer of the Royal Netherlands Army and chairman of the NATO Military Committee from 1957 to 1958.

References

External links 

B.R.P.F. Hasselman

1898 births
1984 deaths
NATO military personnel
Royal Netherlands Army generals
Royal Netherlands Army officers
Chiefs of the Defence Staff (Netherlands)